In physics, a quantum amplifier is an amplifier that uses quantum mechanical methods to amplify a signal; examples include the active elements of lasers and optical amplifiers.

The main properties of the quantum amplifier are its amplification coefficient and uncertainty. These parameters are not independent; the higher the amplification coefficient, the higher the uncertainty (noise). In the case of lasers, the uncertainty corresponds to the amplified spontaneous emission of the active medium. The unavoidable noise of quantum amplifiers is one of the reasons for the use of digital signals in optical communications and can be deduced from the fundamentals of quantum mechanics.

Introduction 
An amplifier increases the amplitude of whatever goes through it. While classical amplifiers take in classical signals, quantum amplifiers take in quantum signals, such as  coherent states. This does not necessarily mean that the output is a coherent state; indeed, typically it is not. The form of the output depends on the specific amplifier design. Besides amplifying the intensity of the input, quantum amplifiers can also increase the quantum noise present in the signal.

Exposition
The physical electric field in a paraxial single-mode pulse can be approximated with superposition of modes; the electric field  of a single mode can be described as

where 
 is the spatial coordinate vector, with z giving the direction of motion,
 is the polarization vector of the pulse,
 is the wave number in the z direction,
 is the annihilation operator of the photon in a specific mode .

The analysis of the noise in the system is made with respect to the mean value of the annihilation operator.  To obtain the noise, one solves for the real and imaginary parts of the projection of the field to a given mode . Spatial coordinates do not appear in the solution.

Physically, the initial state corresponds to the coherent pulse at the input of the optical amplifier; the final state corresponds to the output pulse. The amplitude-phase behavior of the pulse must be known, although only the quantum state of the corresponding mode is important. The pulse may be treated in terms of a single-mode field.

A quantum amplifier is a unitary transform , acting the initial state  and producing the amplified state , as follows:

This equation describes the quantum amplifier in the Schrödinger representation.

The amplification depends on the mean value   of the field operator  and its dispersion . A coherent state is a state with minimal uncertainty; when the state is transformed, the uncertainty may increase. This increase can be interpreted as noise in the amplifier.

The gain  can be defined as follows:

The can be written also in the Heisenberg representation; the changes are  attributed to the amplification of the field operator. The gain is given by

In general, the gain  may be complex, and it may depend on the initial state. For laser applications, the amplification of coherent states is important. Therefore, it is usually assumed that the initial state is a coherent state characterized by a complex-valued initial parameter  such that . Even with such a restriction, the gain may depend on the amplitude or phase of the initial field.

In the following, the Heisenberg representation is used; all brackets are assumed to be evaluated with respect to the initial coherent state.

The expectation values are assumed to be evaluated with respect to the initial coherent state. This quantity characterizes the increase of the uncertainty of the field due to amplification. As the uncertainty of the field operator does not depend on its parameter, the quantity above shows how much output field differs from a coherent state.

Linear phase-invariant amplifiers

Linear phase-invariant amplifiers may be described as follows. Assume that the unitary operator  amplifies in such a way that the input  and the output  are related by a linear equation

The commutator of the field operators is invariant under unitary transformation :

The c-numbers are then

Hence, the phase-invariant amplifier acts by introducing an additional mode to the field, with a large amount of stored energy, behaving as a boson. Calculating the gain and the noise of this amplifier, one finds

and

The coefficient  is sometimes called the intensity amplification coefficient. The gain can be dropped by splitting the beam; the estimate above gives the minimal possible noise of the linear phase-invariant amplifier.

The linear amplifier has an advantage over the multi-mode amplifier: if several modes of a linear amplifier are amplified by the same factor, the noise in each mode is determined independently;that is, modes in a linear quantum amplifier are independent.

To obtain a large amplification coefficient with minimal noise, one may use homodyne detection,  constructing a field state with known amplitude and phase, corresponding to the linear phase-invariant amplifier. The uncertainty principle sets the lower bound of quantum noise in an amplifier. In particular, the output of a laser system and the output of an optical generator are not coherent states.

Nonlinear amplifiers
Nonlinear amplifiers do not have a linear relation between their input and output. The maximum noise of a nonlinear amplifier cannot be much smaller than that of an idealized linear amplifier. This limit is determined by the derivatives of the mapping function; a larger derivative implies an amplifier with greater uncertainty. Examples include most lasers, which include near-linear amplifiers, operating close to their threshold and thus exhibiting large uncertainty and nonlinear operation. As with the linear amplifiers, they may preserve the phase and keep the uncertainty low, but there are exceptions. These include parametric oscillators, which amplify while shifting the phase of the input.

References

Further reading

Quantum optics
Amplifiers
Emerging technologies